Anolis unilobatus, the blue-spotted fan anole, is a species of lizard in the family Dactyloidae. The species is found in Costa Rica, Nicaragua, Honduras, Guatemala, and Mexico.

References

Anoles
Reptiles described in 2010
Reptiles of Costa Rica
Reptiles of Nicaragua
Reptiles of Honduras
Reptiles of Guatemala
Reptiles of Mexico
Taxa named by Gunther Köhler